was a Japanese animation studio. It was founded on October 12, 1983, by Tomohisa Iizuka, then an employee of Tsuchida Production, as its CEO.

On November 16, 2016, the company filed for bankruptcy.

Productions

TV series
Najica Blitz Tactics (2001, with Amber Film Works)
Stratos 4 (2003)
Rumbling Hearts (2003-2004)
Strain: Strategic Armored Infantry (2006-2007)
Glass Maiden (2008)

Video games
Super Real Mahjong PV (1996)
Megami Tengoku II (1996)
Velldeselba Senki: Tsubasa no Kunshō (1997)
Rakugaki Showtime (1999)
Tetris with Cardcaptor Sakura: Eternal Heart (2000)Rave Master (2002)
OVA/ONAsProject A-ko 3: Cinderella Rhapsody (1988)Demon Hunter Makaryūdo (1989)Project A-ko 4: FINAL (1989)A-ko the Versus (1990)Exper Zenon (1991)Madara (1991)Kōryū Densetsu Villgust (1992–1993)Compiler (1994)Aozora Shōjotai (1994–1996)Megami Paradise (1995)Compiler 2 (1995)Sailor Victory (1995)Fire Emblem (1996)Aika (1997–1999)Honō no Labyrinth (2000)Stratos 4 (2004)Stratos 4 Advance (2005–2006)Rescue Me: Mave-chan (2005)Saikano: Another Love Song (2005)Kirameki Project (2005–2006)Sono Mukou no Mukōgawa (2005 music video)Stratos 4 Advance Final (2006)Aika R-16: Virgin Mission (2007)Aika R-16: Virgin Mission (2009)Nozoki Ana'' (2013)

References

External links
 
 

 
Japanese animation studios
Mass media companies established in 1983
Mass media companies disestablished in 2016
Animation studios in Tokyo
1983 establishments in Japan
2016 disestablishments in Japan
Defunct mass media companies of Japan
Nerima
Companies that have filed for bankruptcy in Japan